Józef Wegrzyn (1884–1952) was a Polish film actor.

Selected filmography
 Ludzie bez jutra (1921)
 Ssanin (1924)
 The Unspeakable (1924)
 The Unthinkable (1926)
 Księżna Łowicka (1932)
 Znachor (1937)
 Rena (1938)
 Profesor Wilczur (1938)

References

Bibliography
 Skaff, Sheila. The Law of the Looking Glass: Cinema in Poland, 1896–1939. Ohio University Press, 2008.

External links

1884 births
1952 deaths
Polish male film actors
Polish male silent film actors
20th-century Polish male actors
Male actors from Warsaw
People from Warsaw Governorate